Breath of Heaven may refer to:

 "Breath of Heaven (Mary's Song)", a 1992 song by Amy Grant
 Breath of Heaven: A Holiday Collection, a 1997 jazz album by Grover Washington Jr.
 "Breath of Heaven" a 2021 cover by father daughter duo Mat and Savanna Shaw on their album "The Joy Of Christmas"
 Coleonema pulchellum, or breath of heaven, a shrub endemic to South Africa